Michael Ash is an English former footballer.

Ash began his career as an apprentice with Sheffield United where he graduated to the first team in 1963. In 1965, he transferred to Scunthorpe United. When Freddie Goodwin left Scunthorpe to manage the New York Generals of the National Professional Soccer League in 1967, Ash went with him. In 1969, he transferred to the Atlanta Chiefs. In his last season with the Chiefs, Ash scored in Atlanta's loss to the Dallas Tornado in the 1971 NASL championship game.

References

External links
NASL stats

1943 births
Living people
Footballers from Sheffield
Atlanta Chiefs players
English footballers
English expatriate footballers
National Professional Soccer League (1967) players
New York Generals (NPSL) players
North American Soccer League (1968–1984) players
New York Generals players
Scunthorpe United F.C. players
Sheffield United F.C. players
Expatriate soccer players in the United States
Association football forwards
English expatriate sportspeople in the United States